Thomas Joseph "T.J." Kearns (born 2 June 1966) is a retired Irish athlete who specialised in the high hurdles. He represented his country at three consecutive Summer Olympics, starting in 1988, as well as three consecutive World Championships starting in 1987.

His personal bests are 13.55 seconds in the 110 metres hurdles (Atlanta 1996) and 7.69 seconds in the indoor 60 metres hurdles (Seville 1991).

Competition record

References

1966 births
Living people
Irish male hurdlers
Athletes (track and field) at the 1988 Summer Olympics
Athletes (track and field) at the 1992 Summer Olympics
Athletes (track and field) at the 1996 Summer Olympics
Olympic athletes of Ireland